Liscus was Vergobretus (chief magistrate) of the Aedui of central Gaul in 58 BC. He revealed to Julius Caesar the role of his compatriot Dumnorix in withholding supplies.

References
 Julius Caesar, Commentarii de Bello Gallico 1.16-18

Gaulish rulers
Celts
1st-century BC rulers in Europe
Barbarian people of the Gallic Wars
Aedui